The Williams FW25 is a Formula One car designed by Williams and powered by a BMW V10 engine. The car was used by Williams for the 2003 championship. Three drivers would drive the FW25 in the 2003 season, with Marc Gené replacing regular racer Ralf Schumacher for the Italian Grand Prix after the German suffered a large testing accident testing at Monza's Lesmo 1 corner prior to that race. The other regular driver Juan Pablo Montoya started all of the season's Grand Prix.

Design 

The design of the 2003 Williams FW25 was a marked departure over its predecessor, and was a completely new design compared to the Williams FW24, something that Williams had not done between 2001 and 2002. New to the 2003 design team was ex-Ferrari aerodynamicist, Antonia Terzi, who worked with existing designer Gavin Fisher after the departure of ex-chief aerodynamicist, Geoff Willis.

Season summary 
Although the car could have easily won its first Grand Prix during the Australian Grand Prix but for a costly spin by Colombian driver Juan Pablo Montoya, the car did not establish itself amongst the frontrunners on the grid until the Austrian Grand Prix where Montoya led before retiring with engine failure. Until that race, both drivers complained about understeer due to flaws in the car's design. Montoya cited the FW25 as a favourite of his, praising the balance and the driveability with the powerful BMW engine which suited his aggressive driving style.

A new, wider front tyre introduced by Michelin at the Monaco Grand Prix unlocked the potential of the FW25, which would win that race, score a double-podium at the Canadian Grand Prix, then go on to score dominant 1-2 victories at the European Grand Prix at the Nürburgring, and the next race, the French Grand Prix at Magny-Cours.

A change to the front tyre width (resulting from a protest lodged by Michelin's rivals Bridgestone, through the Ferrari team, after the Hungarian Grand Prix) caused controversy through the paddock, with Williams tipped to lose their competitive edge after that race due to a slimmer tyre design being raced at the Italian Grand Prix at Monza being seemingly at odds with the wider tyre that Williams brought with great effect to the Monaco Grand Prix. Despite Montoya's second place at Monza, being able to stay with eventual World Champion Michael Schumacher's Ferrari throughout the whole race, the FW25 would not win a race in the final three races of the season, the Italian GP, United States GP and Japanese GP took place after the tyre redesign. In fact, after Montoya's second place at the Italian Grand Prix at Monza, the FW25 would not earn another podium in the 2003 season, although Montoya led the final race at Suzuka before retiring with a hydraulics problem.

In popular culture 
On 18 June 2018, it was announced by Codemasters that this car would appear as a classic car in F1 2018.

Complete Formula One results
(key) (results in bold indicate pole position, results in italics indicate fastest lap)

References

External links

Williams Formula One cars
2003 Formula One season cars